Werewolves of the Third Reich is a 2017 British horror film written and directed by Andrew Jones.

Premise
A group of American soldiers stumble upon sinister experiments conducted by an evil Nazi doctor to create an army of werewolf warriors.

Cast
 Annabelle Lanyon as Helga Hammerstein
 David France as Dr. Hammerstein
 Angharad Berrow as Erica Hammerstein
 Dennis Farrin as Sergeant Peck
 Lee Bane as 'Mad Dog' Murphy
 Derek Nelson as Billy 'The Butcher'
 Kwame Augustine as Reggie 'Reckless' Brown
 Darren Swain as Joe 'Fighting Joe' Kane
 Rik Grayson as Wilder
 Joseph Simpson-Bushell as Hyde
 Suzie Frances Garton as Ilsa Koch
 Jared Morgan as The Bartender
 Patrick O'Donnell as SS Officer Schneider
 Tim Larkfield as SS Officer Streicher
 Francesco Tribuzio as SS Officer Becker
 Gareth Lawrence as SS Officer Hess
 Lee Mark Jones as SS Officer Schreck
 Neville Cann as Dr. Josef Mengele
 Oliver Fritz as Adolf Hitler

References

External links

2017 films
British werewolf films
Films about Nazis
2017 horror films
Nazi exploitation films
British science fiction horror films
British action horror films
Horror war films
British science fiction action films
2010s science fiction horror films
2010s war films
2010s action horror films
Mad scientist films
Cultural depictions of Josef Mengele
British war films
Cultural depictions of Adolf Hitler
2017 science fiction action films
British exploitation films
2010s English-language films
Films directed by Andrew Jones
2010s British films